Otodus auriculatus is an extinct species of large sharks in the genus Otodus of the family Otodontidae, closely related to the sharks of the genus Otodus, and also closely related to the later species megalodon. Its teeth were large, having coarse serrations on the cutting edge, and also with two large cusplets.

Assignment to the genus Carcharocles rather than Otodus 

It is known that there is at least one genus in the family Otodontidae, that being Otodus. But the names and number of the genera in Otodontidae is controversial and the family's accepted phylogeny varies among paleontologists in different parts of the world. In the US and Britain the most widespread genus name for otodontids with serrated teeth is Carcharocles, and the owners of unserrated ones Otodus. In countries of the former USSR, like Ukraine or Russia, all of these genera were attributed to Otodus, because scientists like Zhelezko and Kozlov thought that the absence or presence of tooth serrations is not enough to place these sharks in different taxa.

Size 

Distribution 
Most O. auriculatus teeth come from South Carolina and North Carolina. However, many Eocene shark teeth are known from Khouribga Plateau, in Morocco. Fossil teeth have also been found in the United Kingdom and Kazakhstan, and the shark enjoyed a fairly global distribution.

References 

auriculatus
Eocene sharks
Oligocene sharks
Prehistoric fish of Africa
Fossils of Morocco
Paleogene fish of North America
Paleogene United States
Fossils of North Carolina
Fossils of South Carolina
Fossil taxa described in 1923